The Jardin Public tram stop is located on line C of the tramway de Bordeaux. It is named after the nearby Jardin Public ("public garden").

Interchanges

See also
 TBC
 Tramway de Bordeaux

Bordeaux tramway stops
Tram stops in Bordeaux
Railway stations in France opened in 2007